is a town located in Miyagi Prefecture, Japan. , the town had an estimated population of 15,763 in 6028 households, and a population density of 190 persons per km². The area is noted for its rice production.

Geography
Wakuya is in north-central Miyagi Prefecture in the flatlands of the Ōsaki Plains.

Neighboring municipalities
Miyagi Prefecture
Ishinomaki
Tome
Ōsaki
Misato

Climate
Wakuya has a humid climate (Köppen climate classification Cfa) characterized by mild summers and cold winters.  The average annual temperature in Wakuya is 11.0 °C. The average annual rainfall is 1224 mm with September as the wettest month. The temperatures are highest on average in August, at around 23.9 °C, and lowest in January, at around -0.7 °C.

Demographics
Per Japanese census data, the population of Wakuya has declined over the past 40 years.

History
The area of present-day Wakuya was part of ancient Mutsu Province, and has been settled since at least the Jōmon period by the Emishi people. During the Nara period, gold was discovered in the area, and 13 kilograms of gold from Wakuya were used in the construction of the Nara Daibutsu. During later portion of the Heian period, the area was ruled by the Northern Fujiwara. During the Sengoku period, the area was contested by various samurai clans before the area came under the control of the Date clan of Sendai Domain during the Edo period, under the Tokugawa shogunate.

The town of Wakuya was established on June 1, 1889 with the establishment of the modern municipalities system. The town annexed the neighboring village of Moto-Wakuya on December 1, 1948, and the village of Nonodake on July 15, 1955. The 2011 Tōhoku earthquake and tsunami destroyed numerous buildings in the town, and resulted in one fatality.

Government
Wakuya has a mayor-council form of government with a directly elected mayor and a unicameral town council of 13 members. Wakuya and the neighboring town of Misato together contribute one seat to the Miyagi Prefectural legislature. In terms of national politics, the town is part of Miyagi 5th district of the lower house of the Diet of Japan.

Economy
The economy of Wakuya is largely based on agriculture, primarily the cultivation of rice, spinach, and spring onions. Alps Electric has a manufacturing plant in Wakuya.

Education

Wakuya has three public elementary schools (Wakuya No.1 Elementary school(涌谷第一小学校), Gesshoukan Elementary school(月将館小学校), Nonodake Elementary school(箟岳小学校)) and one public junior high school (Wakuya Middle School(涌谷中学校)) operated by the town government. The town has one public high school operated by the Miyagi Prefecturing Board of Education.

Transportation

Railway
 East Japan Railway Company (JR East) -  Ishinomaki Line 
  - 
 East Japan Railway Company (JR East) -  Kesennuma Line

Highway

Local attractions
 Koganeyama Jinja, a Shinto shrine founded in the Nara period (National Historic Site)
 Wakuya Castle
Nagane Shell Mound, Jōmon period shell midden, National Historic Site

Sister city relations
 - Sorø, Zealand, Denmark
 - Buyeo County, South Korea

Noted people from Wakuya 
Saitō Chikudō, Edo-period scholar
Komagatake Kuniriki, Meiji and Taisho-period ōzeki
Kōji Wakamatsu, film director
Kiyono Yasuno,  voice actress

References

External links

Official Website 

Towns in Miyagi Prefecture
Wakuya, Miyagi